Escanaba in Love is the play written by Jeff Daniels as a prequel to Escanaba in da Moonlight (1995). It had its world premiere in 2006 at the Purple Rose Theatre with former PRTC Apprentices Charlyn Swarthout as Big Betty Baloo and Jake Christensen as Albert Soady, Jr.

External links
 Purple Rose Theatre Website

American plays
2006 plays
Plays set in Michigan